Khanom Buang, known as Thai crepes in English.
Kanom Bueang is  an ancient Thai snack known as crispy pancakes in English. It is a popular form of street food in Thailand. These crepes look a bit like tacos. Khanom bueang are usually first topped or filled with meringue, followed by sweet or salty  toppings such as shredded coconut, Foi Thong (strips of fried eggs or egg yolks), or chopped scallions.

History 
Khanom bueang is a Thai snack from the Ayutthaya period. Because in the testimony of Khun Luang ha wat said that, In that era there was no difference between Thai Khanom bueang and Vietnamese Khanom bueang because Vietnamese Khanom bueang has not yet come to Thailand. 
But one of the stories appears in the book "Dhammaboodpadad" and it said that Khanom bueang came from India and Brahmanism in the Sukhothai period and so was brought to Thailand. Moreover many people have assumed that Khanom bueang cake can be related to the crepes in France.

For famous areas in Khanom bueang in Bangkok such as Banglamphu or Talat Phlu etc.

Similar dishes
The Burmese counterpart, known as khauk mont, is comparatively larger, and is made with rice flour, jaggery, and coconut.

See also
 List of Thai desserts

References 

 ขนมเบื้อง( March 21, 2016) Retrieved October 11, 2017 from 
 กระยาทิพย์ เรือนใจ.หนังสือ ปั้นแต่งขนมไทย บก. (2006) Retrieved October 11, 2017
 ณัฐดนัย ยะกุล.ประวัติขนมเบื้องไทยโบราณ( November 13, 2014) Retrieved October 11, 2017 from 
 จับเข่าเล่าประวัติศาสตร์ ( October 13, 2013) Retrieved October 11, 2017 from  
 Khanom Buang Recipe (Thai Crepes)( April 13, 2015) Retrieved October 11, 2017 from 
 ครัวคุณต๋อย|ขนมเบื้องไทย ร้านสรินทร์ทิพย์(ตลาดพลู) (August 15, 2016) Retrieved April 1, 2018 from  
 คุกกิ้งโชว์มาชิมขนมเบื้องในตำนานย่านบางลำภู "ขนมเบื้องแม่ประภา แถมสาธิตสูตรขนมโตเกียวทำทานเอง Retrieved April 1, 2018 from

External links
 Brief description of khanom bueang, with pictures
 Summary of khanom bueang, with pictures
 https://web.archive.org/web/20131021002423/http://www.reocities.com/bourbonstreet/delta/7219/desserts/ie-thai-kanombearng.htm
 https://web.archive.org/web/20161117212003/https://pastebangkok.com/2012/06/15/kanom-buang-take-a-bite-of-history-in-this-ancient-thai-snack/

Thai desserts and snacks
Street food in Thailand
Pancakes
Snack foods
Stuffed desserts